On November 15, 1937 the Ku Klux Klan raid of La Paloma nightclub occurred in an unincorporated area of Miami-Dade County. An estimated 200 Ku Klux Klan members stormed the popular LGBT-serving nightclub, patrons were ordered to leave and the nightclub was shut down for the evening.

Background

Tourist economy and backlash
Miami had recently begun to shift to cater to tourists. Local businesses intended to draw tourist money by offering Miami as a more modern alternative to Havana. To cater to tourists, many local businesses expected a relaxed approach from the vice police to gambling, and more acceptance of foreigners. Some grew frustrated with Miami's new tourism-based economy and began an anti-vice crusade. These included  construction workers affected by business failings in the area. This crusade began during Prohibition and led to the revitalization of the Ku Klux Klan in the Miami area.

Local tensions with La Paloma
La Paloma nightclub's performance offerings included early drag queens known as "female impersonators" singing and telling jokes, women stripping. It was generally understood to cater specifically to LGBT patrons. Many locals called it indecent. Club owner Al Youst had already been arrested six times, but to many residents it seemed that the arrests would not shut the club down.

Raid

Ceremony
On the night of November 15, 1937 hooded members of the Ku Klux Klan gathered at Miami's Moore Park to induct 125 new members. They burned a cross before they assaulted the La Paloma nightclub.

Storming the club
For the first time in ten years the Ku Klux Klan conducted a "night ride" in the Miami area. Around 200 "night riders" (members responsible for burnings and floggings) walked directly into the nightclub. Klan members began smashing furniture, roughing up workers, threatening to burn the building down, all while ordering everyone out of the club. One Klan member explained during the attack that "the visit came because neighborhood residents were afraid of Youst and did not want to appear against him in a court complaint."

Aftermath

Police raid and reopening
Soon after the Ku Klux Klan raid, Dade County Sheriff David Coleman called the club a "menace" and vowed to keep it legally closed. Coleman ordered the nightclub to stop operations after the Ku Klux Klan raid and then ordered a police raid there two weeks later. 

La Paloma reopened again within weeks, though. The club's manager would claim the club offered “spicier entertainment than ever”. A new skit performed at the club featured performers satirizing the Klan raid and donning white hoods.

Miami LGBT community
A stronger sense of unity came to Miami's LGBT community, and La Paloma nightclub became a symbol of LGBT resistance in the city.

See also
 Battle of Hayes Pond
 Ku Klux Klan raid (Inglewood)

References

1930s in LGBT history
20th century in Miami
Ku Klux Klan crimes
LGBT history in Florida
Terrorist incidents in Florida
Riots and civil disorder in Miami-Dade County, Florida
1937 crimes in the United States
1937 in Florida
November 1937 events
Terrorist incidents in the United States in the 1930s
Attacks on nightclubs